Kikuube is a town in the Western Region of Uganda. It is the main municipal, administrative, and commercial center of Kikuube District and the site of the district headquarters.

Location

The geographical coordinates of Kikuube Town are:01°19'58.0"N,  31°12'27.0"E (Latitude:1.332778; Longitude:31.207500).

Population
In July 2020, the Uganda Bureau of Statistics UBOS,  estimated the mid-year population of the town at 18,100 people.

Overview

Kikuube is the headquarters of Kikuube District, which became operational on 1 July 2018. The satellite map of the town shows places of worship of all major religions in the country; (Roman Catholic, Protestant, Islam, Seventh-day Adventist and Pentecostal). There is also a nursery school, a primary school and a secondary school in the town's neighborhood called Kaziranfumbi.

The company employs nearly 600 direct employees and another 800 people indirectly. The registered pool of out-grower farmers exceeded 3,500, as of September 2020.

See also
 Kabwoya
 Kyenjojo–Kabwoya Road
 List of cities and towns in Uganda

References

External links
 Hoima Sugar loses 13 sq miles as NEMA toughens on Bugoma land takeover As of 20 August 2020.

Populated places in Western Region, Uganda
Cities in the Great Rift Valley
Kikuube District